Phil Dumontet (born June 24, 1987) is an American entrepreneur.

He is the Founder & CEO of DASHED, a restaurant delivery service based out of Boston, Massachusetts.
Dashed was acquired by Grubhub in August 2017, as part of the Foodler acquisition.

Education 
In 2009, Dumontet received his Bachelor's Degrees of Art in Marketing and Philosophy from Boston College.

Career 
Dumontet lives along with his wife and started Whole Sol Blend Bar, an organic blend bar in the United States of America. In 2017, he moved from New York to Boulder where he became a 12-time marathoner with a PR of 2:55 and routinely finishes in the top 20 in his age group.

Dumontet serves on the Downtown Boulder Partnership Board.

Dumontet started the company on his bike in 2009 with a Rubbermaid container and one restaurant. He expanded the company to deliver for more than 700 restaurants, as well as goods other than food, including beer, liquor, flowers, bakery items, and Christmas trees. He decided to recruit and hire athletes for rapid delivery, offering medals and cash bonuses to improve their speed.

In 2016, Dumontet was named to Forbes 30 Under 30. In 2017, Dumontet moved to Denver, Colorado and in July 2018 started a new business, Whole Sol Blend Bar, with his wife, Alexa Squillaro.

Dumontet is a contributor to The Washington Post, Business Insider, Entrepreneur Magazine, Fast Company, and Inc. Magazine.

Whole Sol 
Whole Sol was founded in 2018 by husband and wife Duo Phil Dumontet and Alexa Squillaro. Whole Sol a fast-casual, Denver-based restaurant group that serves organic, dairy-free, and gluten-free cuisine.

Boulderthon 
Dumontet is a New York Road Runners marathon runner, finishing in the top 20 for his age group in New York City in 2015, and creator of Boulderthon.  Nearly 3,000 runners registered to run the first Boulderthon, the signature Boulder Marathon, from 48 states and 4 countries.

Personal life 
Dumontet is married to Alexa Squillaro.

Awards 
2016, Dumontet was named to Forbes 30 Under 30.

References 

21st-century American businesspeople
1987 births
Living people